The Mayor of 44th Street is a 1942 film directed by Alfred E. Green. It stars George Murphy and Anne Shirley. It was nominated for an Academy Award in 1943.

Cast
 George Murphy as Joe Jonathan
 Anne Shirley as Jersey Lee
 William Gargan as Tommy Fallon
 Richard Barthelmess as Ed Kirby
 Joan Merrill as Vicky Lane
 Freddy Martin as himself
 Rex Downing as Bits McKarg
 Millard Mitchell as Herman
 Mary Wickes as Mamie

References

External links
 

1942 films
Films directed by Alfred E. Green
Films produced by Cliff Reid
RKO Pictures films
American black-and-white films
American musical drama films
1940s musical drama films
1942 romantic drama films
American romantic drama films
American romantic musical films
1940s romantic musical films
1940s English-language films
1940s American films